After Dark is the first live album by The Make-Up.  It was recorded at The Garage, Highbury, London. Their first one Destination: Love - Live! At Cold Rice was recorded within a studio setting, it was done so with an eye towards spontaneity and improvisation.  "Live" sounds were later mixed into the studio recording to reflect this.

Track listing 

 "Spoken Intro" − 0:36
 "Prelude to Comedown/Can I Hear U Say 'Yea' " − 6:14
 "Blue Is Beautiful" − 2:40
 "At the Tone ... (The Time Will Be)" − 2:44
 "We Can't Be Contained" − 7:25
 "Gospel 2000" − 3:08
 "Vs. Culture" − 1:52
 "We're Having a Baby" − 2:19
 "Make Up Is: Lies" − 1:57
 "R U A Believer" − 1:44
 "Final Comedown" − 1:42
 "Don't Mind the Mind" − 4:50
 "(Here Comes) The Judge" − 3:34

References 

The Make-Up albums
1997 live albums